Jesús Abel Paredes Melgarejo (born 27 May 1997) is a Paraguayan footballer who plays as a defender for Independiente F.B.C.

References

External links

Abel Paredes at Frajeado Profile 

1997 births
Living people
Paraguayan footballers
Paraguay international footballers
Paraguayan Primera División players
Association football defenders
Club Olimpia footballers
Independiente F.B.C. footballers